Thurandina is a Devonian genus from Alken, Germany. It was initially described by Leif Størmer as a chelicerate arthropod possibly belonging to the order Eurypterida. Nowadays, it is classified as incertae sedis inside Euchelicerata.

References

Cited bibliography

Controversial taxa
Devonian animals of Europe
Devonian arthropods
Euchelicerata
Fossils of Germany
Fossil taxa described in 1974